Marius Sophus Lie (17 December 1842 – 18 February 1899) was a Norwegian mathematician. He largely created the theory of continuous symmetry and applied it to the study of geometry and differential equations.

Life and career 
Marius Sophus Lie was born on 17 December 1842 in the small town of Nordfjordeid. He was the youngest of six children born to Lutheran pastor Johann Herman Lie and his wife, who came from a well-known Trondheim family.

He had his primary education in the south-eastern coast of Moss, before attending high school at Oslo (known then as Christiania). After graduating from high school, his ambition towards a military career was dashed when the army rejected him due to poor eyesight. Then he enrolled at the University of Christiania.

Sophus Lie's first mathematical work, Repräsentation der Imaginären der Plangeometrie, was published in 1869 by the Academy of Sciences in Christiania and also by Crelle's Journal. That same year he received a scholarship and travelled to Berlin, where he stayed from September to February 1870. There, he met Felix Klein and they became close friends. When he left Berlin, Lie travelled to Paris, where he was joined by Klein two months later. There, they met Camille Jordan and Gaston Darboux. But on 19 July 1870 the Franco-Prussian War began and Klein (who was Prussian) had to leave France very quickly. Lie left for Fontainebleau where he was arrested, suspected of being a German spy, garnering him fame in Norway. He was released from prison after a month, thanks to the intervention of Darboux.

Lie obtained his PhD at the University of Christiania (in present-day Oslo) in 1871 with a thesis entitled Over en Classe geometriske Transformationer (On a Class of Geometric Transformations). It would be described by Darboux as "one of the most handsome discoveries of modern Geometry". The next year, the Norwegian Parliament established an extraordinary professorship for him. That same year, Lie visited Klein, who was then at Erlangen and working on the Erlangen program.

In 1872, Lie spent eight years together with Peter Ludwig Mejdell Sylow, editing and publishing the mathematical works of their countryman, Niels Henrik Abel.

At the end of 1872, Sophus Lie proposed to Anna Birch, then eighteen years old, and they were married in 1874. The couple had three children: Marie (b. 1877), Dagny (b. 1880) and Herman (b. 1884).

Since 1876, he co-edited the journal Archiv for Mathematik og Naturvidenskab, together with the physician Jacob Worm-Müller, and the biologist Georg Ossian Sars.

In 1884, Friedrich Engel arrived at Christiania to help him, with the support of Klein and Adolph Mayer (who were both professors at Leipzig by then). Engel would help Lie to write his most important treatise, Theorie der Transformationsgruppen, published in Leipzig in three volumes from 1888 to 1893. Decades later, Engel would also be one of the two editors of Lie's collected works.

In 1886, Lie became a professor at Leipzig, replacing Klein, who had moved to Göttingen. In November 1889, Lie suffered a mental breakdown and had to be hospitalized until June 1890. Subsequently he returned to his post, but over the years his anaemia progressed to the point where he returned to his homeland. In 1898 he tendered his resignation in May, and left for home in September the same year. He died the following year in 1899 at the age of 56, due to pernicious anemia, a disease caused by impaired absorption of vitamin B12.

He was made Honorary Member of the London Mathematical Society in 1878, Member of the French Academy of Sciences in 1892, Foreign Member of the Royal Society of London in 1895 and foreign associate of the National Academy of Sciences of the United States of America in 1895.

Legacy 

Lie's principal tool, and one of his greatest achievements, was the discovery that continuous transformation groups (now called, after him, Lie groups) could be better understood by "linearizing" them, and studying the corresponding generating vector fields (the so-called infinitesimal generators). The generators are subject to a linearized version of the group law, now called the commutator bracket, and have the structure of what is today called a Lie algebra.

Hermann Weyl used Lie's work on group theory in his papers from 1922 and 1923, and Lie groups today play a role in quantum mechanics. However, the subject of Lie groups as it is studied today is vastly different from what the research by Sophus Lie was about and "among the 19th century masters, Lie's work is in detail certainly the least known today".

Sophus Lie was an eager proponent in the establishment of the Abel Prize. Inspired by the Nansen fund named after Fridtjof Nansen, and the lack of a prize for mathematics in the Nobel Prize. He gathered support for the establishment of an award for outstanding work in pure mathematics.

Lie advised many doctoral students who went on to become successful mathematicians. Élie Cartan became widely regarded as one of the greatest mathematicians of the 20th century. Kazimierz Żorawski's work was proved to be of importance to a variety of fields. Hans Frederick Blichfeldt made great contributions to various fields of mathematics.

Books 

. Written with the help of Friedrich Engel. English translation available: Edited and translated from the German and with a foreword by Joël Merker, see  and 
. Written with the help of Friedrich Engel.
. Written with the help of Georg Scheffers.
. Written with the help of Georg Scheffers.
. Written with the help of Friedrich Engel.
. Written with the help of Georg Scheffers.

See also 
 Lie derivative
 List of simple Lie groups
 List of things named after Sophus Lie

Notes

References

External links 
 
 
 
 
 "The foundations of the theory of infinite continuous transformation groups – I"  An English translation of a key paper by Lie (Part I)
 "The foundations of the theory of infinite continuous transformation groups – II" An English translation of a key paper by Lie (Part II)
 "On complexes – in particular, line and sphere complexes – with applications to the theory of partial differential equations" An English translation of a key paper by Lie
 "Foundations of an invariant theory of contact transformations" An English translation of a key paper by Lie
 "The infinitesimal contact transformations of mechanics" An English translation of a key paper by Lie
 U. Amaldi, "On the principal results obtained in the theory of continuous groups since the death of Sophus Lie (1898–1907)"  English translation of a survey paper that followed his death

1842 births
1899 deaths
People from Eid, Norway
19th-century Norwegian mathematicians
Group theorists
Members of the French Academy of Sciences
Corresponding members of the Saint Petersburg Academy of Sciences
University of Oslo alumni
Foreign Members of the Royal Society
Foreign associates of the National Academy of Sciences
Academic staff of Leipzig University